The Head of a Young Woman is a drawing in silverpoint on paper by the Florentine painter Leonardo da Vinci, housed in the Royal Library of Turin.

References 

Portraits of women
Drawings by Leonardo da Vinci
15th-century drawings